Valeri Viktorovich Kiriyenko (born 13 February 1965 in Murmansk) is a Russian biathlete, who won two silver medals at the Winter Olympics, and three silver medals at the World Championships.

Biathlon results
All results are sourced from the International Biathlon Union.

Olympic Games
2 medal (2 silver)

World Championships
3 medals (3 silver)

*During Olympic seasons competitions are only held for those events not included in the Olympic program.

Individual victories
1 victories (1 In)

*Results are from UIPMB and IBU races which include the Biathlon World Cup, Biathlon World Championships and the Winter Olympic Games.

External links
 sports-reference.com

1965 births
Living people
Soviet male biathletes
Russian male biathletes
Olympic biathletes of the Unified Team
Olympic biathletes of Russia
Biathletes at the 1992 Winter Olympics
Biathletes at the 1994 Winter Olympics
Olympic silver medalists for the Unified Team
Olympic silver medalists for Russia
People from Murmansk
Olympic medalists in biathlon
Biathlon World Championships medalists
Medalists at the 1992 Winter Olympics
Medalists at the 1994 Winter Olympics
Sportspeople from Murmansk Oblast